Gavrilov-Yamsky District ( or Gavrilov-Yamskiy District) is an administrative and municipal district (raion), one of the seventeen in Yaroslavl Oblast, Russia. It is located in the east of the oblast. Its administrative center is the town of Gavrilov-Yam. Population: 26,558 (2010 Census);  The population of Gavrilov-Yam accounts for 67.0% of the district's total population.

References

Notes

Sources

Districts of Yaroslavl Oblast